Sagu  or SAGU may refer to:

Places
Sauvo or Sagu, Finland
Sagu, Magway, a town in Central Myanmar
Șagu, a commune in Arad County, Romania

Other uses
Sagu (dessert), a southern Brazilian dish
Southwestern Assemblies of God University SAGU, a Christian private university in Waxahachie, Texas
Four-ball billiards or sagu
Phytelephas seemannii or sagu,  a species of flowering plant in the family Arecaceae
Sago or sagu, palm starch
Security Assistance Group-Ukraine